Lupe Madera (December 17, 1952 – December 3, 2005) was a Mexican professional boxer.  He held the title of World Boxing Association (WBA) world junior flyweight champion from 1983 to 1984.

Career
Lupe Madera was born in Sotuta, Yucatán, Mexico. He turned pro in 1972 and was considered a journeyman for most of his career.  In 1982, he was granted a shot at WBA light flyweight title holder Katsuo Tokashiki, but lost a split decision.  The following year they fought a rematch, and the fight was ruled a draw.  Three months later, they fought again, with Madera winning a technical decision after four rounds and capturing the title.  Three months later, they again fought, with Madera successfully defending by winning a decision.  The following year he lost the belt to Francisco Quiroz by KO, and never fought again.

Prior to becoming a world champion, Madera had served as sparring partner for notable Mexican boxers such as Miguel Canto, Guty Espadas, and Juan Herrera.

See also
List of WBA world champions
List of Mexican boxing world champions

References
 

1952 births
2005 deaths
Boxers from Yucatán (state)
Light-flyweight boxers
World boxing champions
World light-flyweight boxing champions
World Boxing Association champions
Mexican male boxers